Mount La Crosse, is a  mountain summit in the Olympic Mountains and is located in Jefferson County of Washington state. It is situated in Olympic National Park and its nearest higher peak is Mount Elk Lick,  to the east.

History

The peak's name derives from the nearby lake with the same name, Lake La Crosse. Members of the 1890 O'Neil Expedition named the body of water "Lake of the Holy Cross" because of a large tree with branches and trunk in the shape of a cross guarded the lake. Over the subsequent years the name transformed to "Lake of the Cross" and eventually to its present-day name. It is also spelled as Mount LaCrosse.

The first ascent of the mountain was made in 1928 by Richard Paulson, William Ryer, Paul Wiseman, and Frank Woodworth.

Climate

Based on the Köppen climate classification, Mount La Crosse is located in the marine west coast climate zone of western North America. Most weather fronts originate in the Pacific Ocean, and travel northeast toward the Olympic Mountains. As fronts approach, they are forced upward by the peaks of the Olympic Range, causing them to drop their moisture in the form of rain or snowfall (Orographic lift). As a result, the Olympics experience high precipitation, especially during the winter months. During winter months, weather is usually cloudy, but, due to high pressure systems over the Pacific Ocean that intensify during summer months, there is often little or no cloud cover during the summer. In terms of favorable weather, June to September are the best months for climbing the mountain. Precipitation runoff from the mountain drains into tributaries of the Dosewallips River and Duckabush River.

See also

 Olympic Mountains
 Geology of the Pacific Northwest

References

External links
 
 Mount La Crosse weather: Mountain Forecast

Olympic Mountains
Mountains of Jefferson County, Washington
Mountains of Washington (state)
Landforms of Olympic National Park
North American 1000 m summits